Calcineurin B homologous protein 1 is a protein encoded in humans by the CHP1 gene (formerly CHP).

Function 

The protein encoded by this gene is a phosphoprotein that binds to the sodium-hydrogen exchangers (NHEs). This protein serves as an essential cofactor which supports the physiological activity of NHE family members. It has protein sequence similarity to calcineurin B and it is also known to be an endogenous inhibitor of calcineurin activity.

Interactions 
Calcineurin B homologous protein 1 has been shown to interact with 
 sodium-hydrogen antiporter 1,
 sodium-hydrogen antiporter 3, and
 sodium-hydrogen anti porter 9.

References

Further reading

External links
 

EF-hand-containing proteins